Atef is the specific feathered white crown of the ancient Egyptian deity Osiris. It combines the Hedjet,  the white crown of Upper Egypt, with curly ostrich feathers on each side of the crown for the Osiris cult. The feathers are identified as ostrich from their curl or curve at the upper ends, with a slight flare toward the base. They are the same feather as (singly) worn by Maat. They may be compared with the falcon tail feathers in two-feather crowns such as those of Amun, which are more narrow and straight without curve.

The Atef crown identifies Osiris in ancient Egyptian painting. Osiris wears the Atef crown as a symbol of the ruler of the underworld. The tall bulbous white piece in the center of the crown is between two ostrich feathers. The feathers represent truth and justice. The Atef crown is similar, save for the feathers, to the plain white crown (Hedjet) first recorded in the Predynastic Period and worn as a symbol for pharaonic Upper Egypt.

See also

 Deshret – Red Crown of Lower Egypt
 Hemhem crown – triple Atef
 Khepresh – Blue or War Crown 
 Pschent – Double Crown of Lower & Upper Egypt
 Shuti hieroglyph (two-feather adornment)

References

 Budge.  An Egyptian Hieroglyphic Dictionary, E.A.Wallace Budge, (Dover Publications), c 1978, (c 1920), Dover edition, 1978. (In two volumes) (softcover)

Crowns (headgear)
Egyptian mythology
Osiris